Studio Disney may refer to the following:

 Studio Disney - Disney programme in Australia.
 Studio Disney UK - Past Disney programme which aired in the United Kingdom until 2005.